This is the discography of English singer-songwriter Colin Vearncombe, better known by his stage name Black.

Albums

Studio albums (released under Black)

Studio albums (released under Colin Vearncombe)

Live albums

Compilation albums

EPs

Singles

References 

Discographies of British artists
Pop music discographies
New wave discographies